Major General Sayed Muhammad Gulabzoi (born 1951) is an Afghan politician. An ethnic Pashtun from the Zadran tribe, Gulabzoi was born in Paktia Province. An Air Force mechanic by training, he studied at the Air Force college. As an air force officer, he supported Daoud Khan's 1973 coup d'état which overthrew King Zahir Shah, for which he was rewarded with the position of Aide to the Air Force Commander. In 1976, he went to the Soviet Union to study radar technology.

He was recruited into the Khalq faction of the communist People's Democratic Party of Afghanistan by Hafizullah Amin. He held only a minor role in the Saur Revolution of 1978, which brought the PDPA to power. Following the coup, he was appointed aide to President Nur Muhammad Taraki, and later Minister of Communications. As internal struggles grew within the communist regime, he distanced himself from Amin, and joined a group of officers(the "gang of four") plotting against Amin, which also included Aslam Watanjar and Assadullah Sarwari. When their coup failed, the conspirators took refuge in the Soviet embassy on September 14, 1979. In December 1979, Gulabzoi and his allies assisted the Soviet invasion of Afghanistan by serving as guides to the invading Soviet troops.

During the invasion, Soviet forces killed Amin and installed Parcham leader Babrak Karmal in power. Karmal was forced to come to terms with the rival Khalq faction, as many key posts in the military were still occupied by Khalqis. As a conciliatory measure, Gulabzoi, a prominent Khalqi, was appointed Minister of Interior. As such he was placed in command of the Sarandoy ("Defenders of the Revolution"), a heavily armed paramilitary gendarmerie force. After Amin's death, Gulabzoy was the self-styled leader of Khalq.

In November 1988, amid renewed tensions between Khalq and Parcham, he was removed from his post and sent to Moscow as ambassador by Parchami president Mohammad Najibullah. He concurrently served as DRA ambassador to Romania and Finland. He was rumoured to have proposed himself to the Soviets as a potential replacement for Najibullah. In March 1990, following an unsuccessful coup attempt by General Shahnawaz Tanai, Gulabzoi was expelled from the party, along with other Khalqis. From 1990 to 1992 he lived in Armenia, before relocating to Moscow.

In 2005 he was elected to represent Khost Province in Afghanistan's Wolesi Jirga, the lower house of its National Legislature.

He holds Master's degrees in Law and Military Science, and sat on the Internal Security Committee.

Alleged KGB Connection 
According to the Mitrokhnin archives, Gulabzoi was a KGB agent code-named 'Momand'.

References

1951 births
Living people
Ambassadors of Afghanistan to the Soviet Union
Communist government ministers of Afghanistan
Members of the House of the People (Afghanistan)
Politicians of Khost Province